Lanao del Norte's 1st congressional district is a congressional district in the province of Lanao del Norte that has been used in the House of Representatives of the Philippines since 1987. The district's boundaries have been redrawn twice, originally consisting of seven municipalities and one city lining the coast of Iligan Bay in 1987, then losing the highly-urbanized city of Iligan to its own separate district in October 2009, and finally with eleven municipalities including its capital, Tubod, since the second reapportionment in November 2009. The district is currently represented in the 18th Congress by Mohamad Khalid Dimaporo of the PDP–Laban.

Representation history

Election results

2019

2016

2013

2010

See also
Legislative districts of Lanao del Norte

References

Congressional districts of the Philippines
Politics of Lanao del Norte
1987 establishments in the Philippines
Politics of Iligan
Congressional districts of Northern Mindanao
Constituencies established in 1987